Patchogue United Methodist Church is a historic United Methodist church at the southwest corner of South Ocean Avenue and Church Street in Patchogue, New York. The official address is 10 Church Street.

It was built in 1889, although the Methodists originally shared a church building with the Congregationalists between 1793 and 1832. The existing church building was added to the National Register of Historic Places in 1984.

References

External links

The United Methodist Church of Patchogue

United Methodist churches in New York (state)
Churches completed in 1889
19th-century Methodist church buildings in the United States
Patchogue, New York
Churches on the National Register of Historic Places in New York (state)
Churches in Suffolk County, New York
National Register of Historic Places in Suffolk County, New York